Sarzeh (also known as Sardeh-e Shahr Derāz) is a village in Howmeh Rural District, in the Central District of Iranshahr County, Sistan and Baluchestan Province, Iran. At the 2006 census, its population was 568, in 118 families.

References 

Populated places in Iranshahr County